Falling Star(s) or The Falling Star may refer to:

Meteor or falling star, the visible passage of a glowing meteoroid through Earth's atmosphere

Film and television
The Falling Star, a 1950 German drama film directed by Harald Braun
Falling Star (film), a 2014 Spanish historical film
"Falling Star" (General Hospital: Night Shift), a television episode
"Falling Star" (The Outer Limits), a television episode

Music
The Falling Star, an album by B! Machine, 2007
"Falling Stars" (Lidia Isac song), 2015
"Falling Stars" (Sunset Strippers song), 2005
"Falling Stars", a song by Serj Tankian from Elect the Dead Symphony, 2010
"Falling Stars", a song by Joe Satriani from Shapeshifting, 2020
"Falling Star", a song by Robert Forster from Calling from a Country Phone, 1993

Other uses
"Falling Star", a section of Star Wars Tales Volume 4
Falling Stars (video game), a 2007 role-playing game
Crocosmia aurea or falling stars, a perennial flowering plant

See also

Fallen Star
Shooting Star (disambiguation)